Valiyev or Valiev (masculine, Cyrillic: Валиев) and Valiyeva or Valieva (feminine, Cyrillic: Валиева) is an Azerbaijani and Tatar surname, meaning "son of Vali". It is closely related to Valeyev. Notable people with the surname include:

Arif Valiyev (1943–2014), Azerbaijani politician
Elmar Valiyev, Azerbaijani politician
Evgeny Valiev (born 1990), Russian basketball player
Mirabi Valiyev (born 1970), Ukrainian sport wrestler
Ravil Valiyev (born 1966), Russian footballer
Rinat Valiev (born 1995), Russian ice hockey defenceman 
Roman Valiyev (born 1984), Kazakhstani triple jumper
Suleyman Valiyev (1916–1996), Azerbaijani writer
Timur Valiev (born 1990), Russian mixed martial artist
Zinyat Valiyeva (born 1974), Azerbaijani paralympic archer
Kamila Valieva (born 2006), Russian figure skater 
Lamiya Valiyeva (born 2002), Azerbaijani Paralympic athlete

Azerbaijani-language surnames
Tatar-language surnames